Tomorrow X Together, a South Korean boy band formed by Big Hit Music consisting of five members Soobin, Yeonjun, Beomgyu, Taehyun and HueningKai debuted in 2019. The group earned several new artist of the year awards including Rookie of the Year at the 34th Golden Disc Awards and the 2019 Melon Music Awards, New Artist of the Year- Album at the 9th Gaon Chart Music Awards and Best New Male Artist at the 2019 Mnet Asian Music Awards.


Awards and nominations

Other accolades

State and cultural honors

Listicles

Notes

References

Tomorrow X Together
Awards